is a 1994 Japanese kaiju film directed by Kensho Yamashita, written by Hiroshi Kashiwabara, and produced by Shōgo Tomiyama. Produced and distributed by Toho Studios, it is the 21st film in the Godzilla franchise, as well as the sixth film in the franchise's Heisei series. The film is notable for the introduction of the monster SpaceGodzilla, as well as the re-introduction of the mecha character M.O.G.U.E.R.A.; its first appearance on-screen since the 1957 film The Mysterians.

Godzilla vs. SpaceGodzilla stars Megumi Odaka, Jun Hashizume, Zenkichi Yoneyama, Akira Emoto, and Towako Yoshikawa, with Kenpachiro Satsuma as Godzilla. The film was released theatrically in Japan on December 10, 1994, and earned ¥1.65 billion in Japanese distributor rentals. In Japan, the film was followed by Godzilla vs. Destoroyah the following year. Godzilla vs. SpaceGodzilla was released direct-to-video in the United States in 1999 by Columbia Tristar Home Video.

Plot
Godzilla cells brought into space by Biollante, in 1990, and Mothra, in 1993, are exposed to intense radiation from a black hole, resulting in the birth of "SpaceGodzilla", which quickly makes his way to Earth, destroying a NASA space station along the way.

Meanwhile, members of the United Nations Godzilla Countermeasures Center arrive at Birth Island in order to plant a mind control device on Earth's Godzilla. The Cosmos, Mothra's twin priestesses, appear to psychic Miki Saegusa and warn her of SpaceGodzilla's arrival. M.O.G.U.E.R.A. (Mobile Operations G-Force Universal Expert Robot: Aero-type), a mecha built by the JSDF to replace Mechagodzilla, is sent in to intercept SpaceGodzilla, but suffers damage in the process.

SpaceGodzilla lands on Birth Island and attacks Little Godzilla with his Corona Beam. Godzilla intervenes but finds himself overwhelmed by SpaceGodzilla's other abilities, and is powerless to stop the clone from trapping Little Godzilla in a crystal prison. SpaceGodzilla leaves for Japan, with Godzilla in pursuit.

Shortly thereafter, the Yakuza abduct Miki and bring her back to their base in Fukuoka in an attempt to use her psychic abilities to gain control over Godzilla. Miki is saved by a rescue team before SpaceGodzilla arrives. SpaceGodzilla lands in central Fukuoka and forms a massive fortress of celestial crystals. M.O.G.U.E.R.A. arrives to once again  fight SpaceGodzilla, but is still no match for him. Godzilla arrives in Kagoshima Bay and fights SpaceGodzilla, but SpaceGodzilla easily gains the upper hand.

The JSDF discovers that SpaceGodzilla is using Fukuoka Tower as a power converter, using it to transform the Earth's core into an energy that SpaceGodzilla can absorb, slowly killing the planet through Earth's volcanos. While Godzilla wrestles with SpaceGodzilla, M.O.G.E.R.A. splits into two different mechas: the Star Falcon, a flying battleship, and the Land M.O.G.U.E.R.A., a tank with a large drill in front of it. The mechas damage the crystal fortress while Godzilla pushes over Fukuoka Tower, cutting off SpaceGodzilla's energy supply. M.O.G.U.E.R.A. quickly reforms and blasts off SpaceGodzilla's crystal-like shoulder formations, weakening him. SpaceGodzilla critically damages M.O.G.U.E.R.A., but is subsequently incinerated by Godzilla's supercharged atomic heat ray. SpaceGodzilla is destroyed, but the JSDF claims that if they keep polluting space another SpaceGodzilla may appear someday.

Godzilla makes his way back to Birth Island after Miki uses her psychic powers to remove the mind control device from his neck. Godzilla turns to her and nods in gratitude. Little Godzilla is then freed from the crystal prison and begins blowing tiny radioactive bubbles.

Cast

Production

Although director Kensho Yamashita and screenwriter Hiroshi Kashiwabara had more experience in producing teen idol movies, they were not newcomers to the kaiju genre, having both assumed minor roles in the making of Terror of Mechagodzilla. The two decided early in production to make the film more lighthearted than its predecessors and more focused on character development, centering it on Megumi Odaka's recurring character Miki Saegusa, who had previously played marginal roles in the series. The emphasis on lightheartedness was such that a scene depicting Godzilla desperately trying to rescue his son from SpaceGodzilla's crystal prison was deleted on account of its seriousness, a move disapproved of by Godzilla suit actor Kenpachiro Satsuma.

The idea of a "Space Godzilla" was first conceived in 1978, and was designed as a homage to the monster's hinted progenitor Biollante by incorporating tusks and a hissing roar reminiscent of the latter monster. Creature designer Shinji Nishikawa had initially envisioned SpaceGodzilla as a much more western dragon-like creature with large fin-like wings on the back. The final design bore greater resemblance to Godzilla's final form from the video game Super Godzilla, itself also designed by Nishikawa. Effects artist Koichi Kawakita redesigned Godzilla's son as a more cartoonish-looking character, having disliked the more dinosaurian-looking version in Godzilla vs. Mechagodzilla II. It was rumoured that Kawakita intended to use the new design in a children's spinoff TV special entitled Little Godzilla's Underground Adventure. However, this was nothing more than a myth. The M.O.G.U.E.R.A. suit was worn by Mechagodzilla performer Wataru Fukuda, and consisted of three pieces applied separately. The new Godzilla suit used for the majority of the film combined aspects of the suits used in Godzilla vs. Biollante/Godzilla vs. King Ghidorah and Godzilla vs. Mechagodzilla II, having a stocky, triangular build, wide shoulders and much less pronounced ribbing on the neck. The face bore similarities to those used in the previous two films, though the eyes were increased in size and given more prominent whites, thus making it relatively less menacing looking than its predecessors. Innovations included the head's ability to fully rotate around the body, and the incorporation of an air duct which solved the chronic ventilation problems present in previous suits. The suit from Godzilla vs. Mechagodzilla II was reused for Godzilla's entrance and exit from Birth Island and during the scene where he is telekinetically tossed by SpaceGodzilla.

The scenes taking place on Birth Island were filmed on Okinoerabu-Shima Island. The actors were unable to return to Japan to film scenes in the studio after a storm suspended air traffic, so they needed to return via ferry so that the filming schedule would not be delayed.

Composer Akira Ifukube refused to be involved in the film after reading the script, which reminded him too much of a teen idol film and included rap music.

Godzilla vs. SpaceGodzilla is the second film to feature brief nudity (following Terror of Mechagodzilla). This occurs when the character Akira Yuki is taking a shower on Birth Island in the evening and his buttocks are briefly seen.

English version
After the film was released in Japan, Toho commissioned a Hong Kong company to dub the film into English. In this international version of the movie, an English title card was superimposed over the Japanese title, as had been done with the previous 1990s Godzilla films.

Columbia TriStar Home Entertainment released Godzilla vs. SpaceGodzilla and Godzilla vs. Destoroyah on home video on January 19, 1999. This was the first time either film had been officially released in the United States. TriStar used the Toho dubs, but cut the end credits and created new titles and opening credits for both films. Toho's complete international version of Godzilla vs. SpaceGodzilla (sans any onscreen text besides the English title) has been broadcast on several premium movie channels since the early 2000s, as well as the 2014 Blu-Ray release.

Reception

Box office
Released on December 10, 1994, the film sold  tickets in Japan and earned ¥1,650,000,000 in Japanese distributor rentals. As the film's release coincided with the Kobe earthquake, Toho feared that the event would put off audiences due to the film's main battle sequence taking place in the same area, and thus sought to remedy this by lowering ticket prices.

Critical reaction
The film received mainly mixed to negative reviews. Monster Zero called the film "a curiously uninvolving effort" that "disappoints in nearly all aspects of the production". American Kaiju criticized the "wildly uneven pacing", "uneven special effects", and "exceedingly lumpy story", but added that "most of the special effects are pretty fair" and "the monster battles are mostly fun." DVD Cult said, "It does have some great destruction scenes and monster battles; two things that make these films worthwhile to begin with. The monster SpaceGodzilla is excellently designed, and is certainly far more menacing than anything Dean Devlin and Roland Emmerich ever dreamed up." Toho Kingdom said the film is "far from terrible" and "an underrated movie" but felt it suffered from an "overly complicated story", "underdeveloped characters", and "forgettable" music.

Home media
Sony - Blu-ray (Toho Godzilla Collection) 
 Released: May 6, 2014
 Picture: AVC-1080P 
 Sound: Japanese and English (5.1 DTS)
 Subtitles: English (Dubtitles) and French
 Extras: Teasers and Theatrical Trailers (7 minutes) [1080i 30fps]
 Notes: This is a 2-Disc double feature with Godzilla vs. Mechagodzilla II.

DVDColumbia/Tristar Home Entertainment Released: February 1, 2000
 Aspect Ratio: Widescreen (1.85:1) Anamorphic [NTSC]
 Sound: English (2.0)
 Region 1
 Note: A double feature with Godzilla vs. Destoroyah. On the U.S. DVD release, the final scene in which Godzilla is in the water while Echoes of Love (Date of Birth) plays is cut; however, it is left in the TV, on demand and Japanese DVD versions.Universe Laser Released: November 24, 2006
 Aspect Ratio: Widescreen
 Sound: (Japanese, Cantonese) Dolby Digital Stereo
 Subtitles English, Chinese (Traditional/Simplified)
 Region 3

Adaptations
A manga adaptation was produced shortly before the film's release, it was written by Kanji Kashiwabara and illustrated by Takayuki Sakai, published by Shogakukan's Ladybug Comics line.

 Awards 
In 1995, the film won the Best Grossing Films Award - Silver Award''.

Appearances in other products
Appeared in the Magic the Gathering set Ikoria: Lair of Behemoths as an alternate card version, which had its subtitle changed from 'Space Corona' to 'Void Invader' mid-release.

References

External links

 
 
 
 
 

1994 films
1990s Japanese-language films
1990s monster movies
1994 science fiction films
Japanese science fiction films
Japanese sequel films
Films about cloning
Films about extraterrestrial life
Films about telekinesis
Films about telepathy
Films produced by Tomoyuki Tanaka
Films set in 1995
Films set in Tokyo
Films set in Japan
Films set in Fukuoka
Films set in Kagoshima
Films set in Kumamoto, Kumamoto
Films set in Sapporo
Films set in Sendai
Films set in Kobe
Films set in Ibaraki Prefecture
Films set on fictional islands
Films shot in Japan
Giant monster films
Godzilla films
Kaiju films
Mad scientist films
Mecha films
Mothra
Toho films
TriStar Pictures films
Yakuza films
Films scored by Takayuki Hattori
Films about father–son relationships
1990s Japanese films
Films about terrorism